Matthew Jared Mervis (born April 16, 1998), nicknamed Mash, is an American professional baseball first baseman in the Chicago Cubs organization. He played college baseball at Duke University. He signed with the Cubs in 2020 as an undrafted free agent. In 2022, he led Minor League Baseball in RBIs, and was third with 36 home runs. He played for Team Israel in the 2023 World Baseball Classic in Miami in March 2023.

Early life
Mervis was born in Washington, D.C., to Jeffrey Mervis and Ellen Van Bergen, and is Jewish. He has one older brother and a younger sister. He was raised in Potomac, Maryland.

High school career
Mervis attended Georgetown Preparatory School in North Bethesda, Maryland, where he played baseball. He earned a spot on the 2014 Perfect Game Preseason Underclassmen All American Team as a High Honorable Mention. As a junior in 2015, he had a .409 batting average with 39 RBIs, while as a pitcher he had a 0.10 earned run average (ERA) and threw a  fastball. He was named 2015 Perfect Game Preseason Underclassmen All American Second Team. 

In 2016, as a senior, Mervis batted .348 with two home runs while also posting a 1.13 ERA with 121 strikeouts. He was named 2016 Perfect Game Preseason Atlantic-All Region First Team. He was selected by the Washington Nationals in the 39th round of the 2016 MLB draft, but did not sign. That summer, he played with the Silver Spring-Takoma Thunderbolts of the Cal Ripken Collegiate Baseball League, and had a .411/.469/.643 slash line over 15 games, with his batting average leading the league and his on-base percentage (OBP) and on-base plus slugging (OPS) ranking third and second, respectively.

Collegiate career
After high school, Mervis enrolled at Duke University where he majored in political science and played four years of college baseball as a pitcher, first baseman, and third baseman. In 2017,  his freshman year at Duke, he had two doubles over six at-bats while pitching to a 2–2 record with a 7.83 ERA and 21 strikeouts over 23 innings pitched. That summer, he briefly played for both the New Bedford BaySox of the New England Collegiate Baseball League and the Hyannis Harbor Hawks of the Cape Cod Baseball League. As a sophomore with Duke in 2019, he collected one hit over four at-bats while going 3–0 with a 4.91 ERA and 21 strikeouts over  innings. That summer, he played for the Kalamazoo Growlers of the Northwoods League. He slashed .316/.395/.450 over 171 over at-bats with 27 runs, 11 doubles, four home runs, 28 RBIs, 22 walks, and four sacrifice flies, ending the season in the top five in each statistic, except OBP, where he ranked seventh. 

During his junior season at Duke in 2019, he pitched in seven games in which he was 1–0 with a 2.16 ERA and eight strikeouts over  innings, while posting a .274/.358/.421 slash line with six home runs and 31 RBIs in 190 at-bats and 48 starts. That summer, he played with the Cotuit Kettleers of the Cape Cod Baseball League where he slashed .325/.418/.571 with four home runs over 77 at-bats with 24 RBIs and was named a league all-star. His batting average and OBP were third in the league with his OPS ranking tenth and his 24 RBIs ranking eighth. Prior to a shortened senior season at Duke in 2020, he was named the 19th-best senior in the country by Perfect Game and was selected as team captain. He had a .304/.458/.589 slash line with three home runs over 16 games while playing first base and pitching two scoreless innings in two games before the season was cancelled due to the COVID-19 pandemic.

Professional career
Mervis went unselected in the five-round 2020 MLB draft, and signed with the Chicago Cubs in June 2020 as an undrafted free agent, as a first baseman. Due to the unique rules of the shortened draft, Mervis only received $20,000 upon signing. He made his professional debut in 2021 with the Myrtle Beach Pelicans of the Low-A East, and also played in three games with the Iowa Cubs of the Triple-A East. Over 72 games between both teams, he batted .208 with nine home runs and 44 RBIs.
 	
Mervis opened the 2022 season with the South Bend Cubs of the High-A Midwest League, for whom he slashed .350/.389/.650 in 100 at bats with 35 runs, seven home runs, and 29 RBIs over 27 games. He was promoted to the Tennessee Smokies of the Double-A Southern League in mid-May, for whom Mervis batted .300/.370/.596 (third in the league)—in 203 at bats over 53 games he had 16 doubles, 14 home runs, and 51 RBIs. In mid-July, he was promoted to Iowa, now members of the Triple-A International League. The Cubs named him their Minor League Player of the Month for August 2022, during which he batted .305 with a .390 OBP and a .926 OPS for Iowa. Over 57 games with Iowa to end the season, he led the International League with a .983 OPS and slashed .297/.383/.593 (leading the league) in 209 at bats with 41 runs, 15 home runs, and 39 RBIs, with a 10% walk rate and a 15% strikeout rate. With each promotion, he lowered his strikeout rate.

His combined 2022 season totals between South Bend, Tennessee, and Iowa included a .309/.379/.605 slash line with 92 runs, 40 doubles, 36 home runs, and 119 RBIs in 510 at bats. He led all of the minor leagues in 2022 with his 119 RBIs, also led the minors in extra base hits with 78, was tied for second in the minors with 40 doubles, and was third in the minor leagues with 36 home runs. He was named the Cubs 2022 Minor League Player of the Year, and an MiLB Organization All Star.

Mervis was selected to play for the Mesa Solar Sox in the 2022 Arizona Fall League. There, he was chosen as the Arizona Rising Stars MVP, an Arizona Fall League Fall Star, and was named the 2022 Fall Stars Game MVP. He batted .291/.344/.655, and led the league in home runs (six), as well as isolated power (ISO; .364) and at bats per home run (9.17).

Jared Banner, Chicago's vice president of player development, said: "He has premium bat speed. His bat stays in the zone for a long time. And he is strong." As to whether he will be in a position to win a major league job in spring training in 2023, Cubs manager David Ross said: "That’s definitely on the radar."

Team Israel; World Baseball Classic

Mervis will play for Team Israel in the 2023 World Baseball Classic, to be held in Miami starting during March 11–15. He will be playing for Team Israel manager Ian Kinsler, and alongside two-time All Star outfielder Joc Pederson, starting pitcher Dean Kremer, and others.

References

External links

Duke Blue Devils bio

Minor league baseball players
1998 births
Living people
People from Potomac, Maryland
Georgetown Preparatory School alumni
Baseball first basemen
Baseball players from Maryland
Duke Blue Devils baseball players
Hyannis Harbor Hawks players
Jewish American baseball players
Cotuit Kettleers players
Myrtle Beach Pelicans players
Iowa Cubs players
South Bend Cubs players
Tennessee Smokies players
Mesa Solar Sox players
2023 World Baseball Classic players